Sidney Humphrey Douglas Searl (10 January 1917 – 11 January 2000) was an Australian rules footballer who played with Richmond in the Victorian Football League (VFL).

Notes

External links 
		

1917 births
2000 deaths
Australian rules footballers from Melbourne
Richmond Football Club players
Port Melbourne Football Club players
Northcote Football Club players
People from Kew, Victoria